Kira Marie Bilecky Drago (born 12 April 1986) is an American-born Peruvian former footballer who played as a defender. She has been a member of the Peru women's national team.

Early life
Bilecky was raised in Washington, D.C. She was born to an American father and a Peruvian mother.

High school and college career
Bilecky has attended the Woodrow Wilson High School in Washington, D.C. and the Purdue University in West Lafayette, Indiana.

Club career
Bilecky has played for Åland United in Finland.

International career
Bilecky joined Peru at the 2005 Bolivarian Games. She capped at senior level during the 2006 South American Women's Football Championship.

Personal life
Bilecky is married to another woman.

References

1986 births
Living people
Citizens of Peru through descent
Peruvian women's footballers
Women's association football defenders
Åland United players
Kansallinen Liiga players
Peru women's international footballers
Peruvian people of American descent
Sportspeople of American descent
Peruvian expatriate footballers
Peruvian expatriates in Finland
Expatriate women's footballers in Finland
LGBT association football players
Peruvian LGBT people
Soccer players from Washington, D.C.
American women's soccer players
Purdue Boilermakers women's soccer players
American sportspeople of Peruvian descent
American expatriate women's soccer players
American expatriate sportspeople in Finland
LGBT people from Washington, D.C.
American LGBT sportspeople
LGBT Hispanic and Latino American people